Ounzeogo-Peulh is a village in the Tenkodogo department of Boulgou province in south-eastern Burkina Faso. In 2005, the village had a population of 147.

References

Populated places in the Centre-Est Region
Boulgou Province